Loreen Tshuma (born 27 November 1996) is a Zimbabwean cricketer. She played for the Zimbabwe women's national cricket team in the 2017 Women's Cricket World Cup Qualifier in February 2017.

In August 2021, she was named in Zimbabwe's squad for their home series against Thailand. She made her Women's Twenty20 International (WT20I) debut on 28 August 2021, for Zimbabwe against Thailand women.

In October 2021, Tshuma was named in Zimbabwe's Women's One Day International (WODI) squad for their four-match series against Ireland. The fixtures were the first WODI matches after Zimbabwe gained WODI status from the ICC in April 2021. She made her WODI debut on 5 October 2021, for Zimbabwe against Ireland.

In November 2021, she was named in Zimbabwe's team for the 2021 Women's Cricket World Cup Qualifier tournament in Zimbabwe.

References

External links
 

1996 births
Living people
Zimbabwean women cricketers
Place of birth missing (living people)
Zimbabwe women One Day International cricketers
Zimbabwe women Twenty20 International cricketers
Tuskers women cricketers